Nickolas Waesne (January 28, 1903 – May 26, 1991), better known as Nick Wasnie, was a Canadian ice hockey right winger who played seven seasons in the National Hockey League for the Chicago Black Hawks, Montreal Canadiens, New York Americans, Ottawa Senators and St. Louis Eagles between 1927 and 1935. He won the Stanley Cup twice with the Montreal Canadiens in 1930 and 1931. After his NHL career Wasnie spent several years in various minor leagues, retiring from playing in 1940. He died in Brainerd, Minnesota in 1991.

Wasnie was inducted into the Manitoba Sports Hall of Fame in 2019.

Career statistics

Regular season and playoffs

Awards and achievements
Stanley Cup Championships (1930, 1931)
CHL First All-Star Team (1935)
AHA First All-Star Team (1937)
Honoured Member of the Manitoba Hockey Hall of Fame
 Member of the Manitoba Sports Hall of Fame (2019)

References

External links

Nick Wasnie's biography at Manitoba Hockey Hall of Fame

1903 births
1991 deaths
Canadian ice hockey right wingers
Chicago Blackhawks players
Kansas City Greyhounds players
Montreal Canadiens players
Newark Bulldogs players
New York Americans players
Ottawa Senators (1917) players
Ottawa Senators (original) players
Pittsburgh Shamrocks players
Quebec Castors players
Rochester Cardinals players
St. Louis Eagles players
Selkirk Jr. Fishermen players
Ice hockey people from Winnipeg
Stanley Cup champions
Winnipeg Maroons players
Canadian expatriate ice hockey players in the United States